This is a list of notable Islamic universities and colleges, and modern universities and institutes within the Muslim names in India.

Islamic university accrediting agencies
 Al Jamiatul Ashrafia, Uttar Pradesh, India
 Al-Jame-atul-Islamia, Raunahi 
 Coordination of Islamic Colleges
 Darul Uloom Deoband
  Darul Huda Islamic University 
 Jamia Al Barkaat Aligarh, Aligarh
 Jamia Amjadia Rizvia, Ghosi 
 Jamiatur Raza, Bareilly
 Manzar-e-Islam, Bareilly
 Nadwatul Ulama

Islamic universities and colleges

 Darul Huda Islamic University, Chemmad, Kerala
 Al-Jame-atul-Islamia, Faizabad
 Al Jamiatul Ashrafia, Mubarakpur, Uttar Pradesh
 Aljamea-tus-Saifiyah, Surat and Mumbai
 Arusiyyah Madrasah, Kilakarai, Tamil Nadu
 Baqiyat Salihat Arabic College, Vellur, Tamil Nadu
 Darul Uloom Raheemiyyah, Bandipora, Kashmir
 Integral University, Lucknow, Uttar Pradesh
 Jamia Amjadia Rizvia, Ghosi, Uttar Pradesh
 Jamia Arifia, Saiyed Sarawan, Uttar Pradesh
 Jamia Darussalam, Oomerabad, Tamil Nadu
 Jamia Islamia Bhatkal, Bhatkal, Karnataka
 Jamia Nizamia, Hyderabad, Telangana
 Jami'a Nooriyya Arabic College, Pattikkad, Kerala
 Jamia Nusrathul Islam, Randathani, Kerala
 Rahmaniyya Arabic College, Katameri Kerala
 Jamiatur Raza, Bareilly, Uttar Pradesh
 Manzar-e-Islam, Bareilly, Uttar Pradesh
 Madrasa Aminia Islamia Arabia, Kashmiri Gate, Delhi
 Markazu Saquafathi Sunniyya, Kozhikode, Kerala

Islamic schools
 Darul Uloom Deoband, Deoband, Uttar Pradesh
 Darul Uloom Waqf, Deoband, Deoband, Uttar Pradesh
 Darul Uloom Nadwatul Ulama, Lucknow, Uttar Pradesh
 Jamia Imam Muhammad Anwar Shah, Deoband, Uttar Pradesh
 Jamia Qasmia Madrasa Shahi, Moradabad, Uttar Pradesh

Urdu universities

Modern universities
 Aliah University, Kolkata, West Bengal
 Aligarh Muslim University, Aligarh, Uttar Pradesh
 B.S. Abdur Rahman Crescent Institute of Science and Technology, Vandalur, Tamil Nadu
 Jamia Hamdard, New Delhi, Delhi
 Jamia Millia Islamia, New Delhi, Delhi
 Khwaja Moinuddin Chishti Language University, Lucknow, Uttar Pradesh
 Mohammad Ali Jauhar University, Rampur, Uttar Pradesh, Uttar Pradesh
 Integral University, Lucknow, Uttar Pradesh
 Maulana Mazharul Haque Arabic and Persian University, Patna, Bihar
 Al-Karim University, Katihar, Bihar
 Noorul Islam Centre for Higher Education, Kumarakovil
 Osmania University, Hyderabad, Telangana
 Islamic University of Science and Technology, Awantipora, Jammu and Kashmir
 Khaja Bandanawaz University, Gulbarga, Karnataka
 Maulana Azad University, Jodhpur, Rajasthan

Modern institutes

Bihar
 Millat College, Darbhanga
 Mirza Ghalib College, Gaya
 Maulana Azad College of Engineering and Technology, Patna

Jharkhand 

 Karim City College, Jamshedpur
 Imamul Hai Khan Law College, Bokaro
 Sheikh B. Medical College, Hazaribagh
 Al Kabir Polytechnic, Jamshedpur

Haryana
 Al-Falah University

Kerala
 Darul Huda Islamic University
 Coordination of Islamic Colleges
 Farook College, Kozhikode
 Ma'din Academy, Swalath Nagar
 Madeenathul Uloom Arabic College, Pulikkal, Malappuram
 Markaz Law College, Kozhikode, Kerala
 MEA Engineering College, Malappuram, Kerala
 Muslim Educational Society, Kerala
 Pocker Sahib Memorial Orphanage College, Tirurangadi
 Thangal Kunju Musaliar College of Engineering, Kollam

Maharashtra
 Maulana Azad College of Arts and Science, Aurangabad

Tamil Nadu
 Jamal Mohamed College, Tiruchirappalli
 MAM College of Engineering, Tiruchirappalli
 M.S.S. Wakf Board College, Madurai
 National College of Engineering, Tirunelveli
 The New College, Chennai
 C. Abdul Hakeem College, Melvisharam
 C. Abdul Hakeem College of Engineering & Technology, Melvisharam

Telangana
 Deccan College of Engineering and Technology
 Deccan College of Medical Sciences
 Lords Institute of Engineering & Technology, Hyderabad
 Muffakham Jah College of Engineering and Technology
 Shadan Institute of Medical Sciences, Hyderabad

Uttar Pradesh
 Halim Muslim PG College, Kanpur
 Ibn Sina Academy of Medieval Medicine and Sciences, Aligarh
 Jamia Al Barkaat, Aligarh
 SKBM Degree College, Dildarnagar
 Shibli National College, Azamgarh, Azamgarh

References

 list
Lists of universities and colleges in India
India